Çakırlı can refer to:

 Çakırlı, Biga
 Çakırlı, Tarsus